Peltariopsis is a genus of flowering plants belonging to the family Brassicaceae.

Its native range is Turkey to Iran.

Species:

Peltariopsis drabicarpa 
Peltariopsis grossheimii 
Peltariopsis planisiliqua

References

Brassicaceae
Brassicaceae genera